Johan Hedenberg (born 9 October 1954) is a Swedish actor.

Biography
Prior to becoming an actor, he worked as a prison officer at Svartsjö Anstalten (Blacklake penitentiary). As a child, he was beaten by his father until his late teens, when he physically assaulted him. After the attack, Hedenberg's father never touched him again but their relationship became very frosty. In the 1980s, he spent much time in the company of Thorsten Flinck and Paolo Roberto. In 1984, after getting into a fight, he lost his job at Dramaten. He soon found work in various TV series and at the end of the 1980s found work in the emerging business of voice acting. With the introduction of commercial television in Sweden, animated shows on TV became more common and Hedenberg found steady work as a voice actor which he still benefits from. As a voice actor, Hedenberg became a popular choice to cast as villains because of his deep voice. He has provided the Swedish voice for several famous cartoon villains such as Dr. Julian Robotnik, Prolix, The Shredder, Dr. Drakken and Dick Dastardly. In 2012, Hedenberg miraculously survived an operation to remove a tumor from his heart which was at high risk at spreading. Hedenberg says that the incident gave him new perspectives on life. He has two daughters from a previous marriage.

Filmography 

 1980 – Sverige åt svenskarna as Messenger
 1984 – Två solkiga blondiner as Glenn the parashooter
 1985 – Åshöjdens BK as Edward
 1986 – På liv och död as Peter
 1988 – Varuhuset as Jonas
 1989 – The Super Mario Bros. Super Show! as Swedish voice of Luigi
 1989 – Asterix and the Big Fight as Swedish voice of Prolix
 1990 – Teenage Mutant Ninja Turtles as Swedish-language voice of Donatello and General Traag in the Media Dubb version
 1992 – Dastardly and Muttley in Their Flying Machines as Swedish voice of Dick Dastardly
 1992 – Porco Rosso as various Swedish background voices
 1993 – Morsarvet as Captain Antonsson
 1993 – Sonic the Hedgehog as Swedish voice of Robotnik
 1993 – Adventures of Sonic the Hedgehog as Swedish voice of Dr. Robotnik
 1993 – Swat Kats as Swedish voice of T-Bone
 1993 – Biker Mice from Mars as Swedish voice of Throttle
 1993 – Rocko's Modern Life as Swedish voice of Heffer and Mrs. Bighead
 1994 – Mighty Morphin Power Rangers as Swedish voice of Bulk
 1994 – Life with Louie as Swedish voice of Andrew "Andy" Anderson
 1996 – Nattbuss 807 as Police Officer Johan
 1997 – Disney's Hercules as Swedish voice of Nessus the Centaur, also the Narrator
 1998 – Beck – Monstret as The Limousin Man
 1998 – The Lion King II: Simba's Pride as Swedish voice of Scar (replacing Rikard Wolff from the first movie)
 1999 – Skilda världar as Morgan Engström
 1999 – Courage the Cowardly Dog as various Swedish voices, like Freaky Fred
 2001 – Harry Potter and the Philosopher's Stone as Swedish voice of Lord Voldemort
 2002–2007 – Kim Possible as Swedish voice of Dr. Drakken
 2003 – Hem till Midgård as The Ship Mechanic
 2005 – Teenage Mutant Ninja Turtles as Swedish voice of Shredder
 2006 – Poliser as Rolf
 2008 – Kungamordet as Björn Larsson
 2008 – Rallybrudar as Sven
 2009 – Detour as Bosse
 2009 – Het Huis Anubis as Swedish voice of Victor
 2010 – Kommissarie Späck as Grünwald Karlsson
 2010 – How to Train Your Dragon as Swedish voice of Stoick the Vast
 2011 – Beyond the Border as Major Adolfsson
 2011 – The Adventures of Tintin: The Secret of the Unicorn as Swedish voice of Captain Haddock
 2013 – Wallander – Saknaden as Herltiz
 2013 – The Death of a Pilgrim as Berg Jr.
 2013 – The Bridge as Axel Mössberg
 2013 – Real Humans as The Police
 2014 – Morden i Sandhamn as Olle
 2015 – Blå Ögon as Johan Landin
2018 – Ted – För kärlekens skull

References

External links 

1954 births
Living people
Swedish male film actors
Swedish male television actors
Swedish male voice actors
20th-century Swedish male actors
21st-century Swedish male actors